Shaanxi Fast Auto Drive Group is one of the major automatic transmission manufacturers in China. It was founded in 1968, and formed a joint venture with Eaton Corporation. It is now the largest automatic transmission manufacturer in China.

External links
Official Site 
2-wangchunyan1-Shaanxi Fast Auto Drive Group Company accomplishes sales proceeds exceeding RMB6.5 billion yuan

Weichai Group
Automotive transmission makers
Companies based in Shaanxi
Manufacturing companies established in 1968